Jean Barnabé (born 3 March 1949) is a former Congolese cyclist. He competed in the individual road race and the team time trial events at the 1968 Summer Olympics.

References

External links
 

1949 births
Living people
Democratic Republic of the Congo male cyclists
Olympic cyclists of the Democratic Republic of the Congo
Cyclists at the 1968 Summer Olympics
Sportspeople from Kinshasa
21st-century Democratic Republic of the Congo people